Protopsephurus is an extinct genus of paddlefish containing the single species Protopsephurus liui, known from the Yixian Formation in Liaoning, northern China from the Barremian to Aptian ages of the Early Cretaceous period around 125-120 million years ago. It is up to be one meter in length. It is currently the oldest and most basal paddlefish known.

Description
The snout is shorter than that in any other known paddlefish, and is more sturgeon-like. The morphology of the skull roof is also more archaic than any other paddlefish. The axial skeleton is poorly ossified. Like other extinct polyodontids, it also has tiny non-interlocking scales approximately 1 mm in diameter called denticles that cover the trunk, which bear a fringe of spikes.

Diet 
Protopsephurus is thought to have been piscovorous, feeding on smaller fish. One adult specimen of Protopsephurus was observed with a specimen of Lycoptera, the most common fish in the formation, preserved in its stomach. Piscivory is likely the ancestral ecology of paddlefish, with only the genus Polyodon making the transition to being planktivorous filter feeders.

Etymology
The name comes from Ancient Greek words "protos" (first) and "psepharos" (cloudy/gloomy one). However the name also translates to "first pebble bearer" from the words "psephus" (pebble) and "phorus" (holder), commonly spelled as "psephurus". Eduard von Martens, a German zoologist and the first person to describe its living relative the Chinese Paddlefish, did not provide a definition on the meaning of the binomial name.

See also

Jiufotang Formation
Paleobiota of the Yixian Formation

References

Early Cretaceous fish of Asia
Cretaceous bony fish
Prehistoric ray-finned fish genera
Acipenseriformes
Fossil taxa described in 1994